Cătălin Constantin Toriște (born 20 May 1996) is a Romanian professional footballer who plays as a right back for Sporting Roșiori.

References

External links
 

1996 births
Living people
Sportspeople from Craiova
Romanian footballers
Association football defenders
Romania youth international footballers
FC Viitorul Constanța players
Liga II players
CS Mioveni players
FC Argeș Pitești players
CS Luceafărul Oradea players